Marcus Clarke is a British puppeteer and voice actor from Nottinghamshire. He is best known as the puppeteer and voice actor behind the BAFTA-winning CITV series Bookaboo and the principal puppeteer of Audrey II in the 1986 version of Little Shop of Horrors. Clarke has worked as a puppeteer in over 60 television series and has created a similar number of puppets. He was also a puppeteer and voice actor in two Muppet feature films and Who Framed Roger Rabbit.

History
Marcus Clarke was born in Forest Gate, East London. He spent several years in Canada, Care and in NCH orphanages before being settled in West Bridgford, Nottinghamshire where he left West Bridgford School, his local comprehensive school with no qualifications. After a series of jobs behind the scenes in theatres, he became stage manager in a West End production of Little Shop Of Horrors, where he looked after Audrey II – the giant plant. He became interested in the art of puppetry. Clarke went on to audition for Jim Henson's TV Puppeteering Workshop, where he befriended Brian Henson.

Inspired in part by Henson, he and his partner, Helena Smee, formed a puppet creation company, "Hands Up Puppets", in 1986. To date, they have created more than 60 puppets and worked as puppeteers on a similar number of UK television series.

Recent work
Bookaboo, 2009 BAFTA-award-winning kids' TV series has Clarke puppeteering a "rock puppy" who is unable to play the drums before one of his friends has read him a story. Designed to back the 2008 National Year of Reading campaign, Bookaboo's friends are celebrities such as Meat Loaf and David Seaman. 

Since 2009, Clarke has been working on new projects, teaching puppetry classes and working with charities. He created a short film with young people at Clayfields House, a secure children's home in Stapleford, Nottinghamshire. Clarke is also on the Board of Funny Wonders Inc, a community interest company, co-organisers of the Buxton Puppet Festival.

Since 2010 Clarke has also been an exhibiting contemporary artist. He created the art movement Puppet TV Graffiti to encompass his new art and craft of puppetisation and began creating and exhibiting puppetised contemporary artworks.
Exhibitions and hangings include.

2015 The DogHorse Coat Art Exhibition. Floor 1 Gallery, Nottingham Central Library, 2–28 Feb 2015

2014 Homeless in the Puppetised City Art Exhibition, one man show, Nottingham. 13x works and video.

2014 Surface Gallery International Postcard Show 1x postcard work.

2012 FAB Fringe Arts Bath 2012. Mis-in-Formation. 3x works exhibited. Curator Diana Ali.

2011 Surface Gallery Nottingham 'Salon des Refuse's' 2x works exhibited.
 
1977 Mansfield College of Art. Various.

Awards
Clarke has been nominated for and won a number of awards, including two BAFTAs for Pre-school Live Action. The first was in 2004 for PJ's Storytime and the second in 2009 for Bookaboo. Bookaboo went on to win Best Children's Programme at the Broadcast Awards. and its category at the Prix Jeuness International. Clarke was also Milky Cat in The Christmas Milkshake Show nominated in the same category in 2009. The young people in Clarke's puppet film, Clayfields House, won two writing awards from the Koestler Trust. He was listed as one of the "prominent people in Nottinghamshire" in 2010 at the Nottinghamshire Archives.

Filmography

Film

Television

References

External links
 YouTube: Puppeteering Clips

Living people
Year of birth missing (living people)
Place of birth missing (living people)
People from Nottingham
English puppeteers
Muppet performers
BAFTA winners (people)
People educated at West Bridgford School